Totness may refer to:

Totness, Suriname 
Totness, South Australia
Totness Recreation Park, South Australia

See also
 Totnes (disambiguation)